Jackass was an American reality comedy series, originally shown on MTV in one year from Fall 2000 to Summer 2001, for 25 episodes in half-hour format, featuring people performing various dangerous, crude, ridiculous, self-injuring stunts and pranks.

Series overview
Each episode is approximately 21:30 in length (without commercials), except for the first (20:05) and last (19:30) episodes and the one-hour special (41:50 without ads).

The pilot was originally broadcast April 12, 2000 on the MTV Network, then repeated as the first episode of the series on October 1, 2000. Episodes were broadcast on Sunday nights on MTV. Reruns were shown in weeks without an original broadcast, and the entire series was rebroadcast into early 2002.

Episodes

Season 1 (2000)

Season 2 (2001)

Season 3 (2001)

DVD releases
The DVD release of the Jackass television series is unconventional in that instead of being released as full season sets as the show was originally aired, the individual stunts and sketches were re-compiled into 22 new "episodes", and released on five DVDs over a 7 year period.

Contrary to popular assumption, Volumes One through Three do not line up exactly with the TV seasons and each volume contains segments from across all three seasons. However, the opening stunt of each DVD "episode" does correspond to the same number TV episode's first stunt, and several of the other stunts also match in each episode. Volume 1 "episodes" 1-5 roughly correspond to s1 e1-5, Volume 2 1-5 to s2 e1-5, and Volume 3 1-6 to s3 e1-6. The remaining 3 episodes from each season have no match.

The 3 volumes were packaged into a box set with a bonus disc. The bonus disc contains the one hour special episode "Gumball Rally 3000", presented as originally aired. The bonus disc also includes a few stunts not found in the 3 volumes, as well as various bonus features like outtakes and interviews.

Volume Four, sub-titled "The Lost Tapes", compiles the rest of the segments that hadn't yet been included in the previous three volumes and the bonus disc, plus bits that never aired on the TV series (mostly for censorship reasons). Volume 4 "episode" 1 begins with the "Johnny Cannonball" intro that also begins s1e1 (the pilot). The opening stunt "Self Defense" is also from the pilot; though it doesn't appear first in the original episode, it was the first stunt officially filmed for the TV series (in November 1998). There is no correspondance in the rest of the DVD "episode" 1, nor in the remaining "episodes" 2-5.

Volumes Two and Three were released by Paramount Home Video shortly after the conclusion of the series in December 2002. Volume One was delayed, but first released in the 3-volume box set in December 2005, and then released by itself a month later on January 23, 2006. The bonus disc with Gumball Rally 3000 and other material was released only in the 3-volume box set of December 2005, and has not been released separately. The fourth volume "The Lost Tapes" was finally released in October 2009.

Volume One

Volume Two

Volume Three

Bonus Disc

The Lost Tapes

Unreleased segments
Bits that were filmed but never got released on the TV series include:

"The Escaped Convict" where Johnny Knoxville is dressed up in an L.A. County Jail orange prison jumpsuit with handcuffs around his wrists and ankles, he then walks into a hardware store and asks the co-workers for a hacksaw to cut the handcuffs with.
The original hotel room "Vomelet" where Dave England consumes the ingredients for an omelet then vomits them up into a hot skillet. (released 2006 on Jackass Unrated DVD, and 2009 on The Lost Tapes DVD)
"Skid Row Party Boy" where Chris Pontius dances in front of homeless people while wearing nothing but a thong.
"Dry Throat" where Ehren McGhehey eats a spoon full of flour for $20 which he does successfully, but nearly suffocates.
Wee Man and Preston Lacy being dressed as Oompa Loompas while Wee Man is riding a skateboard and Preston is riding a scooter in public.
Steve-O sticking a fire cracker in his ass and igniting it.
Pontius taking a piss in a crowded elevator.
"Poo Dollar" where Brandon DiCamillo and Bam Margera put shit on a dollar bill then leaving it on the ground for unsuspecting victims to pick up. This was shown briefly in the 2001 film CKY3.
"Poo Door Handle" where Dave England wipes his shit on Jeff Tremaine's hotel room door handle.
"Tremaine's Revenge" where Tremaine pisses in Dave's suitcase.
"Poo Sock" where Knoxville pretends to have both of his hands broken, he then goes to a store to try on new shoes while having both of his socks covered in shit.
Steve-O shooting fireworks at Pontius who uses his ass as a shield.
A music video for Shaquille O'Neal's song "Psycho" featuring Preston, Pontius, Steve-O and Wee Man doing stunts.
"Bammy Poppins". (released 2006 on Jackass Unrated DVD, and 2009 on The Lost Tapes DVD)
"Box Down Stairs". (released 2006 on Jackass Unrated DVD, and 2009 on The Lost Tapes DVD)
"Putt Putt" where Knoxville visits a mini-golf course and treats it like a full-scale driving range. (filmed in 2001 for season 2 or 3; released 3/13/08 on jackassworld.com, and 2009 on The Lost Tapes DVD)

Some of these deleted bits were released on:
"Too Hot For TV" DVD
CKY video series
Don't Try This at Home: The Steve-O Video
"Jackass: The Movie" unrated re-edit 2006 DVD
jackassworld.com website
"Jackass: The Lost Tapes" 2009 DVD

Re-releases
Between March and April 2022 the complete series was re-released streaming on Paramount+, along with the 5 compilation "episodes" from the DVD "Jackass: The Lost Tapes", which contain bits that never made it to air, as "Season 4".

References

External links

Jackassworld. Archived from the original. Official Jackass website, launched Dec. 12, 2007, defunct late Mar. 2010.
Jackass - MTV - Watch on Paramount Plus.

Lists of American comedy television series episodes
Lists of American reality television series episodes
Jackass (TV series)

ru:Чудаки (сериал)
zh:蠢蛋搞怪秀